The White Lantern Corps is a fictional organization appearing in comics published by DC Comics, related to the emotional spectrum.

Publication history
The White Lantern Corps first appeared in Blackest Night #7 and was created by Geoff Johns and Ivan Reis.

Fictional team history
The first White Lantern Corps member was Sinestro of Korugar when he bonded with the Life Entity, the embodiment of life itself. However, the Entity is removed from Sinestro by Nekron, and then claimed by Hal Jordan who, joined by the Flash, use its power to rescue Superman, Superboy, Wonder Woman, Donna Troy, Ice, Animal Man, Kid Flash, and Green Arrow, who had all been turned into Black Lanterns by Nekron, as well as the Anti-Monitor. Jordan then used the power of the Entity to sever Nekron's tether to the living world, Black Hand. The revived Black Hand regurgitated twelve white rings that destroyed Nekron's body, and revived the Martian Manhunter, Aquaman, Deadman, Hawkman, Hawkgirl, Jade, Firestorm (Ronnie Raymond), Osiris, Hawk, Maxwell Lord, Captain Boomerang, and Professor Zoom.

After the defeat of Nekron, all heroes that had been turned into White Lanterns are discharged from the Corps, save for Deadman, who is shown to be the only resurrected character retaining a white power ring as of Brightest Day #0.

The Entity tells Deadman that it is dying, and that he needs to find the "chosen one" to replace it; this becomes Deadman's assigned task. Deadman considers Hal Jordan to be the perfect candidate, and tells the Entity to take him to him. Instead of taking him to Hal Jordan, the White Lantern Ring takes Deadman and Dove to Aquaman and Mera. Aquaman explains what the White Lantern has told him: to find Jackson Hyde. Deadman questions why the Lantern has taken him to Aquaman when he should be searching for the Entity's replacement, and the ring replies that to find the new Entity, Deadman must help all the other resurrected complete their tasks. Aquaman understands what is at hand and explains to Deadman that for him to succeed, he must find and help others and explain to them what needs to happen.

Meanwhile, the White Lantern is acquired by Deathstorm (the Black Lantern version of Firestorm) who, by infecting it with his essence, is able to generate Black Lantern duplicates of the twelve heroes and villains resurrected by the Entity, apparently with the goal of preventing the resurrected from completing their tasks.

When his white ring reaches 100%, Deadman approaches Hawkman and Hawkgirl after their mission on Hawkworld. As a secondary labor, the Entity has asked them to live separate lives so that they may strengthen their existence, but they object. Hawkman tries to remove the White Power Ring from Deadman by force, but the Entity reduces them to white dust in front of Deadman's eyes. Meanwhile, Deathstorm and the Black Lanterns are shown delivering the White Battery to someone on Qward.

Deadman commands the ring to resurrect the two heroes, but the ring refuses, saying that this is part of the Entity's plan. It is revealed that when Nekron attacked the Earth, not only was the Entity mortally wounded, but the contamination of the planet was also heightened. Furthermore, the corruption will rise up in the form of another "dark avatar" of the darkness who will try to destroy the Star City forest, which is the key to save Earth's soul. The Entity resurrects the twelve characters with different purposes. Some of them, like Hawk, Maxwell Lord and Jade, are supposed to prevent further disasters and give Deadman and the Entity more time. But five of them (Aquaman, Firestorm, Martian Manhunter, Hawkman and Hawkgirl) are resurrected in order to overcome what held them back in life (what the Hawks already did by destroying the curse that haunted them) and by completing their tasks. Thus, their life force is purified and the ring takes their essences back because they are essential in saving Earth. Deadman also has a secondary purpose: to supply the white ring with power by embracing life.

Later, the ring takes Deadman to the beach where Aquaman and Aqualad are battling Black Manta and Siren. There, the Entity reveals to Deadman that it was the Entity that freed the Xebel soldiers from the Bermuda Triangle in order for Aquaman learn the truth about Mera. Aquaman's alliance sends the soldiers of Xebel back to the Bermuda Triangle, therefore completing Aquaman's task, but the Entity reduces Aquaman to water, to Mera's sorrow.

As Martian Manhunter completes his task, he is approached by the Entity, who tells him to choose between Mars and Earth. Martian Manhunter chooses Earth, and as he returns to the planet and reaches the forest in Star City he is again approached by Deadman. Deadman pleads for forgiveness, and the Martian Manhunter says he understands because it is "part of the plan"; the Entity then merges the Martian Manhunter's essence with the planet Earth. Meanwhile, Firestorm discovers that the Anti-Monitor seeks to harvest the life energy within the White Lantern in order to grow stronger. Firestorm takes the Lantern and attempts to fight the Anti-Monitor, but is defeated. Deathstorm then brings Professor Stein out of his Matrix to taunt the two. Deathstorm attempts to turn Ronnie to salt, but the Professor takes the brunt of the attack. Angered, Ronnie decides to truly work together with Jason to avenge the Professor. The Entity then declares that Ronnie has accomplished his mission, returning life to him in a burst of white energy that obliterates the Black Lanterns, returns Jason's father to his home, and deposits Firestorm in the Star City forest. Ronnie angrily attempts to make the Entity resurrect the Professor, but is refused. Deadman then arrives demanding that he be given the White Lantern.

When the "Dark Avatar" makes his presence known, Deadman is forced to collect Ronnie's essence, turning Firestorm into one of the Elementals. The life forces of Aquaman, Martian Manhunter, Hawkman and Hawkgirl are also revealed to be part of the Elementals, which guard the forest located in Star City. They have been transformed by the Entity to represent the elements of Water (Aquaman), Fire (Firestorm), Earth (Martian Manhunter), and Wind (Hawkman and Hawkgirl). These elements protect the Star City Forest from the "Dark Avatar", which is revealed to be the Swamp Thing corrupted into a Black Lantern.

The Entity reveals that Alec Holland perished in an explosion in his lab, and that the present Swamp Thing is not actually Holland but rather an elemental being that thinks it is Holland as a result of absorbing his memories. The Elementals end up fighting Swamp Thing, and the Entity explains that Alec Holland must become the new Swamp Thing. While the Entity tries to familiarize itself with Alec Holland, Captain Boomerang arrives to take part in his labor; it is revealed that Captain Boomerang's mission was to free Hawk as an Avatar of War from the Lords of Chaos, because his act of saving Dove would have broken their hold on him to be his own self. However, he fails to catch the boomerang he threw and instead it is caught by Boston Brand. Because of this, Boston Brand dies and uses his final act to transfer his white power ring to Alec Holland and bring him back to life, allowing him to become the new Swamp Thing and cleanse "the Green" from Nekron's influence by destroying the corrupted Swamp Thing. As Swamp Thing, Alec Holland restores life to natural areas around the world and declares that those who hurt "the Green" will face his wrath. He also restores Aquaman, Firestorm, Hawkman, and Martian Manhunter to normal.

In the aftermath, Aquaman and Mera are reunited and are seen examining the Xebel technology, which turns out to be made from Atlantean technology. Ronald Raymond and Jason Rusch must find a way to contain their Firestorm matrix from the explosion less than ninety days hence. Hawkman discovers that Hawkgirl has not been restored to normal and goes off to look for her. Doctor Erdel's daughter Melissa begins to lose her mind, and the Martian Manhunter helps remove a piece of debris from her head. The book ends with Swamp Thing killing several businessmen who have engaged in polluting activities.

The New 52
In September 2011, The New 52 rebooted DC's continuity. In this new timeline, the events of the "Rise of the Third Army" storyline has Kyle Rayner unite the powers of all seven Corps to stop the latest threat, despite Kyle's uncertainty about his ability to channel the powers. After Kyle has mastered the seven powers of the emotional spectrum, he is transformed into a White Lantern with the ability to destroy some members of the Third Army, and now will apparently be able to stop the threat of the Guardians of the Universe. Later, Kyle and Carol Ferris arrive at the destroyed planet Korugar. Sinestro attacks them both, blaming them that his home planet is destroyed by the villainous First Lantern. He notices that Kyle has become a White Lantern and demanded that Korugar be restored, but Kyle fails to resurrect Korugar. Sinestro struggles with Kyle for the white ring, attempting to become a White Lantern himself, but the ring rejects him. The white ring then comes into the possession of Simon Baz, but he is rejected as well. The white ring then returns to Kyle's ownership.

After he absorbs the power of the Life Equation when passing through the Source Wall to defeat Relic, Kyle realizes that his power has grown too great for him to keep it all under control and that he would die very soon because of it, caused him to create the 'Oblivion' entity to destroy himself so that he cannot endanger anyone else. However, various other ring-wielders (including Carol and the repowered Saint Walker) band together and convince him to have hope, resulting in Kyle working with the Templar Guardians to split his ring into seven rings, each finding a new wearer who will wield some of the power of the Life Equation without risking them to be corrupted by that power (with the option of recombining into one ring in a time of great crisis).

DC Rebirth
Subsequently, in DC Rebirth, Ganthet and Sayd call Kyle Rayner to test his White Lantern power which they believed can bring back the Blue Lantern Corps, however when Saint Walker attempts a psionic link to Kyle's ring, an unknown presence prevented Kyle from channeling his power to that extent, resulting in his ring to 'downgrading' back to a conventional Green Lantern ring.

Powers and abilities
 

Each White Lantern possesses a power ring that lets the user create white energy constructs powered by life itself. The original wielder of the Entity, Sinestro, displays the ability to eradicate swarms of Black Lanterns effortlessly and is described as "godlike". He also appears to survive a seemingly fatal wound from which he recovers within minutes. When Hal Jordan wields the power, he demonstrates the ability to create additional rings and restore heroes claimed by Nekron to life.

When Deadman possesses a white ring, he demonstrates the ability to resurrect a dead bird. He is also able to transform the area of land devastated by Prometheus into a lush forest. However, this seems to be the work of the Entity, as Deadman had been unable to access the ring's powers himself.

Similar to black rings, white rings initially have no charge. As the wearer embraces life, the ring rises in power level. What happens when a white ring reaches one hundred percent charge remains unknown. The only thing known is that the ring as it charged itself gave Deadman the sensation that someone would die. As the ring reached 100%, it forced Deadman to meet the Hawks where the ring tasked them with a second labor: to live separate from each other in order to grow stronger. However, when Carter and Shiera refused to obey, both lovers were reduced to white dust in the process.

A green ring can be altered to function like a white ring if the user can master the emotional spectrum. This version of the ring is similar to a much more powerful version of the standard green ring, and ignores the Third Army's resistance to Lantern constructs, but displays no other special properties thus far. This white ring was unable to perform the resurrection of a planet's worth of beings that had died all at once, but it has not yet been tested on an individual basis to determine if this is a limitation of function or simply scope; Kyle claimed that he can only heal rather than raise the dead, but this may be an assumption rather than a fact. He was later able to help Hal Jordan return to life after he was 'overloaded' trying to confront the Sinestro Corps with his new power ring, but it is unclear if Hal was explicitly dead at that point or just on the verge of death.

When Kyle Rayner is in possession of the white ring (and of his modified Green Lantern ring), he is able to utilize the abilities and functions of the other seven colored rings: the red plasma of the Red Lantern ring, humanoid and independent construct generation from the Orange Lantern ring, constructs based on the fears of a target from the Sinestro Corps ring, intricate and complex constructs hailing from the Green Lantern ring, constructs that raises its targets hopes and heals wounds, illnesses, and ailments from a Blue Lantern ring, teleportation from an Indigo Tribe ring, and Star Sapphire crystals that can control targets and force them to feel love from the Star Sapphire ring. He cannot channel the abilities of a black ring.

As the sole White Lantern, Kyle Rayner briefly had the Life Equation within his ring and could use the power of the entire spectrum. Eventually, he had to split the Life Equation into seven parts and placed into Kyle's and six newly created permanent White Power rings and sent the rings out to choose their new bearers. These seven rings can be brought together to restore the Life Equation if needed but until that time the White Lantern Corps will guard the equation. When Kyle built the rings he felt they should come with an "instruction manual". Each wearer of these new rings will innately understand how to use the ring. The ring will not instruct the bearer on what to do but it will tell the bearer on how to do it.

Members
 Saysoran of Sector (unknown) - Resident of Sussurus who is inducted into the White Lantern Corps. Saysoran would be herself chosen by Kyle Rayner in the near future, to receive the power of the Life Equation before his departure into the Source.
 Tallahe of Sector (unknown) - Resident of Fifth Sline Seven who is inducted into the White Lantern Corps.
 Mehenash Exeter of Space Sector (unknown) - Resident of Kalimawa and former warden of the Anomaly that held Relic before the latter escaped, Mehenash is later inducted into the White Lantern Corps.
 Romgan Shay of Sector (unknown) - Resident of the Nest who is inducted into the White Lantern Corps.
 Telos Usr of Sector 1760 - A resident of Daxam who is inducted into the White Lantern Corps.
Earth of Sector 2814 - The Justice League used The Totality to defeat the Ultraviolet Lantern Corps. The result of this meant that Earth itself was inducted into the White Lantern Corps.

Former members
 Kyle Rayner of Sector 2814 - After mastering the seven colors of the emotional spectrum into his own ring, Kyle created the white light and became a White Lantern. Kyle is the only White Lantern whose powers did not originate from the Entity or being chosen by the ring. For a brief moment Kyle lost the white ring to Sinestro and then to the new Green Lantern of Earth, Simon Baz. However the ring soon returned to him after finding the two former lanterns unsuitable as hosts. The only other person who the ring found suitable is Hal Jordan. Kyle had the ring stolen once again by Highfather who wanted to use it as a weapon against Darkseid. Highfather however has since returned the power back to Kyle after Hal Jordan was able to convince Highfather to retreat and cease the conflict with the various Lantern Corps. Soon afterwards and in order to prevent himself from using the Life Equation and to finally defeat Oblivion, Kyle Rayner using the help from the Templar Guardians, created seven white rings each one containing a piece of the Life Equation. Later, Kyle was channeling his power to such extent that it made his ring's power to shut down and return as a conventional Green Lantern ring.
 Simon Baz of Sector 2814 – Chosen by the white ring itself, but found him unsuitable after an attempt to restore Sinestro's home planet Korugar.
 Sinestro of Sector 1417 – Possessed by the Entity and discharged from the Corps after Nekron removed the Entity from him. During the events of "Wrath of the First Lantern", Sinestro tries to become a White Lantern once again so he could reconstruct Korugar and resurrect all its inhabitants, stealing Kyle Rayner's white ring, but the ring found him unsuitable as a host.
 Swamp Thing of Sector 2814 – The Chosen One that took the Entity's place.
 Hal Jordan of Sector 2814 – Possessed by the Entity. Discharged from the Corps after Nekron's defeat.
 Superman of Sector 2813 – Discharged from the Corps after Nekron's defeat.
 Green Arrow of Sector 2814  – Discharged from the Corps after Nekron's defeat.
 Kid Flash of Sector 2814 – Discharged from the Corps after Nekron's defeat.
 Superboy of Sector 2814 – Discharged from the Corps after Nekron's defeat.
 Wonder Woman of Sector 2814 – Discharged from the Corps after Nekron's defeat.
 The Flash of Sector 2814 – Discharged from the Corps after Nekron's defeat.
 Donna Troy of Sector 2814 – Discharged from the Corps after Nekron's defeat.
 Ice of Sector 2814 – Discharged from the Corps after Nekron's defeat.
 Animal Man of Sector 2814 – Discharged from the Corps after Nekron's defeat.
 Batman of Sector 2814 – Chosen by Deadman, but discharged after the ring reveals that Batman was not the true heir to the White Light.
 Deadman of Sector 2814 – Chosen to be the vessel of the Entity. Discharged from the Corps after giving his life to protect Dove and create the new Swamp Thing.

Entity

Nekron unearths a creature referred to as the "Trespasser". Like Nekron, the White Lantern Entity does not belong to the emotional spectrum, but instead is the embodiment of the white light that creates life. It assumes the shape of a massive winged humanoid creature. There is no telling if the birth of the Entity was by accident or with purpose. As the light fought against darkness, stars and planets were born including a planet at the very spot the Entity entered – Earth. As the Entity's influence spread, life was created and, with life, emotions. As emotions began to manifest, so did the seven emotional embodiments.

It appears that the Entity resided inside the White Power Battery that landed in Silver City, New Mexico and communicated with Deadman through his white ring. The Entity reveals that it is dying and that the twelve heroes and villains were resurrected with the express purpose to complete a task before they can truly live again.

The Labors of the Twelve

 Deadman – Locate "the chosen one" that will take the Entity's place. Mission Accomplished after being mortally injured saving Dove, his lifeforce was used to resurrect the Swamp Thing. 
 Hawkman – Prevent Queen Khea from leaving Hawkworld. Mission Accomplished.
 Hawkgirl – Prevent Hath-Set from killing Hawkman. Mission Accomplished
 Martian Manhunter – Burn down the newly formed forest on Mars. His lifeforce was merged afterwards with the planet Earth to create the Earth Elemental. He was restored to normal when Swamp Thing became the new Life Entity. Mission Accomplished
 Aquaman – Locate Jackson Hyde before Xebel's Death Squad does. His lifeforce was collected by the Entity afterwards to create the Water Elemental. He was restored to normal when Swamp Thing became the new Life Entity. Mission Accomplished
 Firestorm (Ronald Raymond and Jason Rusch) – Learn from each other and defeat the Black Lantern Firestorm (currently calling himself Deathstorm) in the Firestorm Matrix before he destroys the Entity. Ronnie's lifeforce was collected by the Entity afterwards to create the Fire Elemental. Ronnie was restored to normal when Swamp Thing became the new Life Entity. Mission Accomplished
 Hawk – Catch the boomerang that Captain Boomerang throws at Dawn Granger. Mission Failed as the Avatar of War cannot be influenced by the Life Entity. 
 Professor Zoom – Free Barry Allen from the Speed Force. Mission was already accomplished in The Flash: Rebirth. Mission Accomplished
 Captain Boomerang – Throw a boomerang at Dawn Granger. Mission accomplished
 Osiris – Save his sister Isis from her fate. Mission Accomplished
 Maxwell Lord – Prevent Magog from plunging the world into war. Mission Accomplished
 Jade – Help her brother Obsidian to "balance the darkness". Mission Accomplished

The Entity also allowed itself to be corrupted by Deathstorm, the Black Lantern version of Firestorm, and brought back the Black Lantern versions of the twelve resurrected heroes and villains. It was later moved to Qward in the Anti-matter universe only to take some kind of information from the Anti-Monitor. The White Power Battery has since been returned to Earth and after locating the Chosen One, the Entity and the White Power Battery left for parts unknown.

New 52
In September 2011, The New 52 rebooted DC's continuity. In this new timeline, the Life Entity, as well as all the emotional entities, are revealed to be dying due to unknown causes. Relic, a scientist from a previous version of the DC Universe, is reintroduced when he is released from his prison unwittingly by Kyle Rayner and Star Sapphire (Carol Ferris). The Templar Guardians reveals that the light manipulated by the various Lanterns, referred to as "lightsmiths" by Relic, is not infinite in supply, and draws from a source beyond his knowledge. He seeks to locate the supposed reservoir and destroy all of the Lantern Corps in order to prevent the end of another universe. Relic succeeds in ending the Blue Lantern Corps and destroying the Green Lantern Central Power Battery, and the planet Oa. After Oa's destruction, the Entity, Ophidian, Ion (who had been released from the Green Lantern Central Power Battery), Adara (who fled the Blue Lantern Central Power Battery prior to its destruction), Proselyte and the Predator seek out Kyle Rayner, whom they believe can locate both Relic and the reservoir in order to save the universe, even if it means sacrificing themselves. The entities take Kyle Rayner's body and flee to Ysmault where they free the Butcher from Atrocitus. The only Entity who remained unaware of their plans is Parallax, who was currently being controlled by Sinestro during the Forever Evil story arc (which was running concurrently with Lights Out).

Relic identifies the reservoir of the emotional spectrum as being inside the Source Wall, and heads there along with his captured light from the destroyed Corps and Batteries. Kyle manages to overcome the influence of the various entities, subduing them inside his body but not driving them out. He and the Templar Guardians find Relic at the Source Wall, and come to the same conclusion that the light used profusely was a finite resource; the only question was how to replenish it. Relic seeks to experiment on the entities inside of Kyle, with the intention of using them to replenish the source, but is stopped by a contingency of Green, Red, and Indigo Lanterns, who mean to stop Relic from going any further. Hal Jordan, John Stewart, Guy Gardner, who is now a Red Lantern, and Kyle Rayner, execute a plan to drive Relic into the Source Wall where he will be trapped forever. Kyle pushes them away and breaks through the Source Wall, which had become significantly weaker with the draining of the light source, and releases the entities inside of him, who sacrifice themselves and seemingly Kyle himself, to replenish the light source and defeat Relic.

DC Rebirth
With the revelation that the entire Multiverse was created by Perpetua, it can be assumed that the Life Entity is actually the primordial energy source of the Life Force itself, one of the seven hidden forces of reality which Perpetua wielded and used to allow life to flourish.

White Lantern Oath 
“In brightest day, in darkest night,

Let my ring shine the brightest light.

When evil comes, I will join the fight, 

The power of the White Lanterns,

Is the strongest might!”

Other versions

Flashpoint
In the alternate timeline of the "Flashpoint" event, the Entity slumbers deep beneath the Earth's surface. Concerned for its safety, the Guardians of the Universe order Abin Sur to locate it in order to retrieve it and bring it back to Oa before Earth is destroyed. When Abin Sur arrives on Earth, he refuses to look for the Entity until after he helps Earth's superhumans stop the Atlantis/Amazon war. The Guardians grow impatient with Abin and discharge him from the Corps. During the final battle of the Atlantis/Amazon War, a device triggered by the Atlanteans triggers an earthquake. Abin leaps into a crevice in an attempt to stop the destruction only for his ring to run out of power. The Entity then awakens and joins with Abin, turning him into the White Lantern and giving him the power to restore the Earth before he flies out into space.

The Spectrum War
In the six-part comics miniseries produced jointly by IDW Publishing and DC Comics, Star Trek—Green Lantern: The Spectrum War, it is revealed that Nekron was reborn at some future point in the DC Universe, eliminating Kyle Rayner to prevent the White Entity being summoned again before unleashing an army of the dead on the universe. When only a few survivors are left, Ganthet triggers the 'Last Light' protocol to transfer all remaining ring-wielders to another universe- specifically, the alternate Star Trek universe created by Nero- but Nekron follows them through. In a confrontation on the 'reborn' Vulcan, Captain James T. Kirk is inspired by Hal Jordan's story to have Spock wield various excess rings transferred through with Ganthet, correctly guessing that Spock has the necessary willpower and emotional control to wield all seven rings himself, allowing him to unleash the White Entity of Life and defeat Nekron once again. As well as this temporary restoration of the White Entity, Montgomery Scott is able to analyse the various spare rings and replicate his own version of the White ring; although this version is basically just a finger-mounted phaser with a force field, it notably turns Hikaru Sulu's uniform white when he first dons it.

In other media
Kyle Rayner as a White Lantern appeared as a playable character in Lego Batman 3: Beyond Gotham.

References

Green Lantern characters
Fictional organizations
DC Comics superhero teams
Comics characters introduced in 2011
Characters created by Geoff Johns
Fictional characters with death or rebirth abilities